Red Love (Italian: Amore rosso) is a 1921 Italian silent drama film directed by Gennaro Righelli and starring Maria Jacobini, Amleto Novelli and Arnold Kent.  It was shot at the Fert Studios in Turin.

Cast
 Maria Jacobini	as 	Juanita, la manola
 Amleto Novelli	as l'espada Barrena
 Arnold Kent as don Alvaro de San Rosario
 Oreste Bilancia	as 	padre di Isabella
 Orietta Claudi	as 	Isabella de los Rios
 Ida Carloni Talli	as la Tia
 Alfonso Cassini		
 Silvio Orsini

References

Bibliography
 Dalle Vacche, Angela. Diva: Defiance and Passion in Early Italian Cinema. University of Texas Press, 2008.
 Goble, Alan. The Complete Index to Literary Sources in Film. Walter de Gruyter, 1999.

External links

1921 films
1920s Italian-language films
Films directed by Gennaro Righelli
Italian silent feature films
Italian black-and-white films
Italian drama films
1921 drama films
Silent drama films
1920s Italian films

it:Amore rosso (film 1921)